The 1990 Vuelta a España was the 45th edition of the Vuelta a España, one of cycling's Grand Tours. The race finished in Madrid on 15 May.

Stage 1
24 April 1990 — Benicàssim to Benicàssim,  (ITT)

Stage 2a
25 April 1990 — Oropesa to Castellón,

Stage 2b
25 April 1990 — Benicàssim to Borriana,  (TTT)

Stage 3
26 April 1990 — Dénia to Murcia,

Stage 4
27 April 1990 — Murcia to Almería,

Stage 5
28 April 1990 — Almería to Sierra Nevada,

Stage 6
29 April 1990 — Loja to Ubrique,

Stage 7
30 April 1990 — Jerez to Seville,

Stage 8
1 May 1990 — Seville to Mérida,

Stage 9
2 May 1990 — Cáceres to Guijuelo,

Stage 10
3 May 1990 — Peñaranda de Bracamonte to León,

Stage 11

References

01
1990,01